Latur Lok Sabha constituency is one of the 48 Lok Sabha (parliamentary) constituencies of Maharashtra state in western India.

Assembly segments
Presently, after the implementation of delimitation of the parliamentary constituencies in 2008, Latur Lok Sabha constituency comprises the following six Vidhan Sabha (Legislative Assembly) segments:

Members of Parliament

Election results

General elections 2019

General elections 2014

General elections 2009

General elections 2004

See also 
• Latur district

Notes

External links
Latur lok sabha  constituency election 2019 results details

Lok Sabha constituencies in Maharashtra
Latur district
Politics of Nanded district